Myscelia is a genus of nymphalid butterflies found in southern North America, Central America, and northern South America.

Species
The species in the genus are:
 Myscelia aracynthia (Dalman, 1823)
 Myscelia capenas (Hewitson, [1857])
 Myscelia cyananthe C. & R. Felder, [1867] – blackened bluewing
 Myscelia cyaniris Doubleday, [1848] – blue wave, blue-banded purplewing, tropical blue wave, whitened bluewing, or royal blue
 Myscelia ethusa (Doyère, [1840]) – Mexican bluewing or blue wing 
 Myscelia hypatia Strecker, 1900
 Myscelia leucocyana C. & R. Felder, 1861
 Myscelia milloi Oberthür, 1916
 Myscelia orsis (Drury, [1782])

References

External links 

Biblidinae
Nymphalidae of South America
Nymphalidae genera
Taxa named by Edward Doubleday